High School Musical: el desafío is a spin-off film, to the High School Musical franchise. It is one of three feature film adaptations of a script written by Pablo Lago and Susana Cardozo and based on the book Battle of the Bands. The film stars the finalists of the reality television High School Musical: La Selección competition series, created with participation of the musical duo Jesse & Joy. To coincide with the Mexican target audience, some of the soundtrack is of the reggaeton genre.

High School Musical: el desafío premiered in Mexico on September 5, 2008. The premiere was held on August 24, 2008 at the Auditorio Nacional in Mexico City.

Plot
Cristóbal (Cristóbal Orellana), the captain of the school football team, "Los Borregos", discovers that his neighbor and classmate, Mariana (Mariana Magaña), has changed a lot over the summer. Meanwhile, Luli (Mar Contreras) is still as vain as ever and overshadows her poor brother, Fernando (Fernando Soberanes), and his companions, whom she refers to as "The Invisibles." A new school year begins at High School Mexico (HSM, initially interpreted), and the school has announced a "Battle of the Bands" contest hosted by Jesse & Joy. Working against the clock and with limited resources, the guys put forces for the big day. Cristobal, Mariana, and a few of their peers, come together and form a band called "Fair Play". In an effort to win, Luli dares the impossible task of separating Cristobal from his friends. But only one band will be the winner; the one who understands that teamwork, personal development, and hard work will make them better artists and also better people.

Cast of characters

Other media

Soundtrack
The film's soundtrack was released on August 15, 2008, and features the same songs composed by Fernando Lopez Rossi for the Argentine version of the film, but with different arrangements (e.g. reggaeton). The soundtrack also includes a cover of "Dime Ven" from Mexican band Motel and the song "La Vida Es Una Aventura", performed by Jesse & Joy.

 El Verano Terminó (High School Musical: El Desafio cast)
 Siempre Juntos (High School Musical: El Desafio cast)
 La Vida Es Una Aventura (Mariana Magaña, Fernando Soberanes)
 Yo Sabia (Cristóbal Orellana, Mariana Magaña)
 A Buscar El Sol (Mariana Magaña)
 Hoy Todo Es Mejor (Cristóbal Orellana)
 Dime Ven (High School Musical: El Desafio cast)
 Superstar (Mar Contreras, Paulina Holguin, Fabiola Paulin, Carolina Ayala)
 Mejor Hacerlo Todos Juntos (Cristóbal Orellana, Mariana Magaña Mariana, Fernando Soberanes, Juan Carlos Flores, Jorge Blanco, Stephie Camarena, Cesar Viramontes)
 Actuar, Bailar, Cantar (High School Musical: El Desafio cast)
 Doo Up (Mariana Magaña, Fernando Soberanes) [Bonus Track]

Chart positions

Weekly charts

Year-end charts

Home media
The DVD of the film was released on December 2, 2008, 5 months sooner than previously advertised.

 The Summer Ended (Music Video)
 Segments of "Express" from Disney Channel
 Commercial: "The Challenge Behind the Dream" from Disney Channel

Novel
High School Musical: el desafío was transcribed into a novel, and was released by Random House. The book contains 8 pages of stills from the film.

References

External links
 
 Pagina Oficial (Cinemas)
 Pagina Oficial (Disney DVD)

High School Musical films
2008 films
2000s high school films
2000s musical films
2000s romantic musical films
Walt Disney Pictures films
Mexican musical films
2000s Mexican films